The Voice Kids is a Ukrainian television music competition created to find new singing talent. The second season began airing on 1 February 2015 on 1+1. Tina Karol returned as a coach, while Potap and Natalia Mohilevska joined the show as replacements for former coaches, Oleg Skrypka and Svetlana Loboda. Yuri Gorbunov presented the show for the first time, replacing Andrii Domanskyi.

Coaches and finalists

 – Winning coach/contestant. Winners are in bold,eliminated contestants in small font.
 – Runner-up coach/contestant. Final contestant first listed.

Blind auditions
During the Blind auditions, each coach must now form a team of 15 young artists.

It airs from 1 February.

Color key

Episode 1 (1 February)

Episode 2 (8 February)

Episode 3 (15 February)

The Battles
In the second stage, called the battle phase, coaches have three of their team members battle against each other directly by singing the same song together, with the coach choosing which team member to advance from each of individual "battles" into the Sing-Off stage.

Color key

Episode 4

The Sing-Off 
Each coach brought his or her team after the "Battle" back to four acts, but there were only two candidates to the final. All four contestants will battle each other in "The Sing-Off", where they re-sung their audition song. The coaches then selected two of the four contestants to move to the live finals.
Color key

Episode 5 (22 February)

Final

Episode 6 (1 March)

Round 1 
In this phase of the competition, each of the top six finalists took the stage and performed a solo song. The television audience choose the final three artists who advanced to the next round.

Round 2 
The final round of the competition featured the top three finalists performed a solo song. Before the start of the performances, voting lines were opened live-in-show for the television audience to vote for the final three and decide the winner. The winner of The Voice Kids was announced at the end of the show.

References

The Voice of Ukraine
2015 Ukrainian television seasons